Ebony Collins (born March 11, 1989) is an American sprinter who specializes in the 400 metres and 400 metres hurdles.

After a stellar track season in 2005, Collins was named USA Track & Field Youth Athlete of the Year. Ebony holds USA Track and Field age group records in the 4 × 100 metres relay and 400 metres hurdles

Collins attended Woodrow Wilson Classical High School in Long Beach, California.

Ebony as a (2005) sophomore sprinter from Long Beach Wilson High School won four gold medals and ran national bests in three events  at the CIF California state track and field championships in Sacramento will be long remembered as one of the best individual performances by a female athlete in state history.

Ebony was a multiple time college All-American.  Running for West Los Angeles College, she earned a Western State Conference and Southern California community college championship record 400m hurdles record in 57.67

References

External links

1989 births
Living people
Track and field athletes from Long Beach, California
American female sprinters
American female hurdlers
21st-century American women
20th-century American women